Beau Snellink (born 14 May 2001) is a Dutch speed skater.

He won the gold medal in the team pursuit event at the 2021 World Single Distances Speed Skating Championships. and repeated this again in 2023.

Personal records

Source:

At the end of the 2022–2023 speed skating season Snellink occupied the 57th position on the 
adelskalender with a score of 148.993 points

Tournament overview
Source:

References

External links

2001 births
Living people
Dutch male speed skaters
World Single Distances Speed Skating Championships medalists